Ovila Bergeron was a politician and business person in Quebec, Canada.

Background

He was born on February 17, 1903, in Warwick, Quebec.

Political career

Lemieux ran as a Bloc Populaire Canadien candidate in the provincial district of Stanstead in the 1944 election and won against incumbent Raymond-François Frégeau.  He served as his party House Whip from 1945 to 1948.  He did not run for re-election in the 1948 election. He was mayor of Magog between 1952 and 1956 and, in interim, to June 22, 1966, at November 6, 1967.

Death

He died on December 3, 1985.

Footnotes

1903 births
1985 deaths
Bloc populaire MNAs
People from Centre-du-Québec
People from Magog, Quebec